Tiny Town was a New Orleans rock-blues band formed in 1997. The band was formed by singer Pat McLaughlin, with guitarists Tommy Malone and Johnny-Ray Allen, both of The Subdudes, and drummer Kenny Blevins. Malone returned to work with the Subdudes.

Album
The group recorded only one album, Tiny Town, in 1998. The song "Follow You Home" from the self-named debut album was featured on NBC's "Homicide.".

References

Musical groups from New Orleans